"Raise a Hallelujah" is a song by Bethel Music, Jonathan David Helser and Melissa Helser, which was released as the second single from Bethel Music's eleventh live album, Victory (2019), on March 8, 2019. The song was written by Jake Stevens, Jonathan David Helser, Melissa Helser and Molly Skaggs. Ed Cash handled the production of the single.

"Raise a Hallelujah" is Bethel Music's as well as Jonathan and Melissa Helser's first single to breakthrough to the top ten sector of the US Hot Christian Songs chart, peaking at No. 2. The song became their first No. 1 entry on the Christian Airplay chart, and also charted on the US Bubbling Under Hot 100 at No. 17, becoming the highest-charting single for all three acts. The song was nominated for Worship Recorded Song of the Year at the 50th Annual GMA Dove Awards.

Background
"Raise a Hallelujah" was initially released by Bethel Music on January 4, 2019, as one of four promotional singles from Victory (2019), in the lead-up to its release which was slated for January 25, 2019. The song was born out of a spontaneous moment in worship and prayer as the Helsers processed and responded to the news that Jaxon Taylor, the son of Bethel Music chief executive officer Joel Taylor, had contracted Hemolytic-uremic syndrome (HUS) which had been caused by an E. coli infection, and was in a life-threatening situation. Joel Taylor, in an interview with Faithwire, shared that Jonathan David Helser had then recorded what was an almost complete song and sent it to him, which he then played over Jaxon, who was lying in a hospital bed, from his phone repeatedly. Over time, Jaxon fully recovered from the sickness. Joel Taylor also indicated in his interview with Faithwire that the song was never planned to be on the album, calling the song's inclusion on the album was a "last minute decision," and noted that it was being prepared for a nationwide radio debut.

The studio-recorded version of "Raise a Hallelujah" was released in digital format on March 8, 2019. The song then impacted Christian radio in the United States on March 15, 2019.

Composition
The vocal range of the singers spans from A♭3 to B♭4.

Commercial performance
Following the song's release as a promotional single, "Raise a Hallelujah" made its debut at No. 28 on the US Hot Christian Songs chart dated January 19, 2019, as published by Billboard. It concurrently debuted on the Christian Digital Song Sales chart at No. 4 that same week. Billboard reported that "Raise a Hallelujah" broke through the top ten of the Hot Christian Songs chart, debuting at No. 8 because of substantial gains in radio airplay, the feat being achieved after spending 19 weeks on the chart. The song went on to peak at No. 2 on Hot Christian Songs. "Raise a Hallelujah" became the first No. 1 Christian Airplay chart entry for Bethel Music, Jonathan David Helser and Melissa Helser, reaching the peak on the August 24-dated chart.

Music videos
Bethel Music released the live music video of "Raise a Hallelujah" with Jonathan David Helser and Melissa Helser leading the song during a worship service at Bethel Church through their YouTube channel on January 3, 2019. Melissa Helser revealed in an Instagram post that it was the first time they sang the song to Jaxon since recovering and being released from the hospital. The lyric video of the song was released on January 24, 2019, on YouTube by Bethel Music. An acoustic performance video shot on location in North Carolina, with the Helsers singing was published on YouTube on September 4, 2019.

Accolades

Track listing

Charts

Weekly charts

Year-end charts

Certifications

Cover versions
 Nevada-based CCM band I Am They released an acoustic performance video of the song.
 American gospel artist Anthony Evans released an R&B-infused version of the song on his eighth studio album, Altared (2019).
 British worship band New Wine Worship released a live cover of the song on their album, This Is Love (2019).
 Passion released a live cover featuring Brett Younker as a promotional single from the album, Roar (Live From Passion 2020) (2020).

Release history

References

External links
  on PraiseCharts
  on PraiseCharts
 

2019 singles
2019 songs
Bethel Music songs